Geoff Warburton is a Grammy nominated songwriter from Toronto, Ontario.  

In 2023, Warburton signed a joint music publishing deal with Big Machine Music and Range Media Partners  

Warburton was previously signed with Sony/ATV Music Publishing. 

Songwriting discography

References

Living people
Canadian songwriters
People from Pickering, Ontario
Year of birth missing (living people)